In Greek mythology, Helice ( (modern ; Ancient Greek:   Helike) means "willow") was a name shared by several women:

 Helice, nurse of the god Zeus during his infancy on Crete. Her name suggests that she was a "willow-nymph", just as there were oak-tree nymphs and ash-nymphs (Dryads and Meliae). It is likely that she is the same as Ide. When Cronus once came to Crete in search of Zeus, the young god himself and his companions by turning them into bears, as he became a serpent. Later, when he became king, he made them both constellations, Helice becoming Ursa Major, while Cynosura became Ursa Minor. Helice, in antiquity, was a common proper name for the constellation Ursa Major. In one version, Demeter asks the stars whether they know anything about her daughter Persephone's abduction, and Helice tells her to ask Helios, who knows the deeds of the day, because the night is blameless and knows nothing.
 Helike, a nymph who became the wife of King Oenopion of Chios and mother by him of Melas, Talus, Maron, Euanthes, Salagus, Athamas and Merope (Aero).
 Helike, an Aegialian princess as the only daughter of King Selinus who wed her with Ion. By the latter, she became the mother of Bura. Later on, Ion built a city which he named after Helice.

Notes

References 
 Aratus Solensis, Phaenomena translated by G. R. Mair. Loeb Classical Library Volume 129. London: William Heinemann, 1921. Online version at the Topos Text Project.
 Aratus Solensis, Phaenomena. G. R. Mair. London: William Heinemann; New York: G.P. Putnam's Sons. 1921. Greek text available at the Perseus Digital Library.
Graves, Robert, The Greek Myths: The Complete and Definitive Edition. Penguin Books Limited. 2017. 
 Pausanias, Description of Greece with an English Translation by W.H.S. Jones, Litt.D., and H.A. Ormerod, M.A., in 4 Volumes. Cambridge, MA, Harvard University Press; London, William Heinemann Ltd. 1918. . Online version at the Perseus Digital Library
 Pausanias, Graeciae Descriptio. 3 vols. Leipzig, Teubner. 1903.  Greek text available at the Perseus Digital Library.

Oreads
Queens in Greek mythology
Princesses in Greek mythology
Deeds of Demeter
Metamorphoses into animals in Greek mythology
Helios in mythology
Deeds of Zeus
Ursa Major (constellation)